Igor Jeličić  (born 28 February 2000) is a Serbian professional footballer who plays as a central defender for Vojvodina.

Career statistics

Club

References

External links
 
 

Living people
2000 births
Footballers from Novi Sad
Serbian footballers
Association football defenders 
FK Vojvodina players
FK Kabel players
Serbian SuperLiga players
Serbian First League players